Woodrow Lewis (November 8, 1916 – July 18, 1989) was an American politician who served in the New York State Assembly from the 53rd district from 1973 to 1982.

He died of heart failure on July 18, 1989, in Brooklyn, New York City, New York at age 72.

References

1916 births
1989 deaths
Democratic Party members of the New York State Assembly
20th-century American politicians